In 2016, Arizona had 268 megawatts (MW) of wind powered electricity generating capacity, producing 0.5% of in-state generated electricity.

History
Utility-scale wind power in Arizona began in 2009 with the commissioning of the first phase of the Dry Lake Wind Power Project in Navajo County.

Installed capacity and wind resources 
The following table compares the growth in wind power installed nameplate capacity in megawatts (MW) for Arizona and the entire United States since 2008.

Arizona has the potential to install up to 10.9 GW of onshore wind power nameplate capacity at 80 meter, 74.4 GW at 110 meter, or 191.0 GW at 140 meter hub height, generating 585 TWh annually. For comparison, Arizona consumed 69.391 TWh of electricity in 2005; the entire U.S. wind power industry was producing at an annual rate of approximately 50 TWh at the end of 2008; Arizona's Palo Verde Nuclear Generating Station produced 26.782 TWh in 2007; and Three Gorges Dam (the world's largest electricity-generating station) produced an average of 80 TWh/yr in 2008 and 2009.

Wind farms

Operating
 Dry Lake Wind Power Project in Navajo County is Arizona's first utility-scale wind farm. Phase 1 consists of 30 Suzlon 2.1 MW wind turbines, for a total nameplate capacity of 63 MW. Iberdrola Renewables built the wind farm in 2009 for $100 million, and sells the output to Salt River Project.
 Kingman Wind Farm, built in 2011, has 10 MW of wind turbines.
 Perrin Ranch Wind Farm in Coconino County began operation in 2012 with 62 wind turbines, generating 99.2 MW of electricity.
 Fort Huachuca has an 850 KW two blade wind turbine installed in 2011.
 Red Horse 2 Wind and Solar Project has 30 MW of wind turbines installed in 2015.

Planned
 As of 2012, BP Wind Energy of North America proposed building the Mohave County Wind Farm project comprising up to 258 wind turbines on federally managed lands in Mohave County. The site – about 49,000 acres of public land – is in the White Hills area about 40 miles northwest of Kingman and 20 miles southeast of Hoover Dam. The project should have up to 500 MW of capacity and construction may be in phases. Transmission lines are planned to connect to existing Western Area Power Administration lines. The project was sold to NextEra Energy and renamed the White Hills Wind Project. Larger turbines will be used, reducing the number needed. An interconnection to WAPA's Mead-Peacock 345-kV transmission line was approved by WAPA in May 2019. Construction of the 127 turbine farm began in 2020, with initial power output expected by the end of the year. Southern California Clean Power Alliance has signed a 20-year power purchase agreement for 300 MW from the wind farm.

Small-scale wind power

Flagstaff is the home of Southwest Windpower.

The ASU School of Sustainability in Tempe, Arizona features an array of small wind turbines on its roof, with real-time data available to the public through the ASU Campus Metabolism web site.

Environmental impact
According to the USDOE, each 1000 MW of wind power capacity installed in Arizona will annually
save 818 million gallons of water and eliminate 2.0 million tons of carbon dioxide emissions.

For comparison, Arizona emitted a total of 101,510,000 tonnes of carbon dioxide in 2007.

Wind generation

Source:

See also

 Index of Arizona-related articles
 List of U.S. states by carbon dioxide emissions
 List of wind farms in the United States
 Outline of Arizona
 Solar power in Arizona

References

External links